Desulfitobacterium metallireducens is an anaerobic bacterium that couples growth to the reduction of metals and humic acids as well as chlorinated compounds. Its type strain is 853-15A(T) (= ATCC BAA-636(T)). It was first isolated from a uranium-contaminated aquifer sediment.

References

Further reading

Dworkin, Martin, and Stanley Falkow, eds. The Prokaryotes: Vol. 4: Bacteria: Firmicutes, Cyanobacteria. Vol. 4. Springer, 2006.

External links 
LPSN

Type strain of Desulfitobacterium metallireducens at BacDive -  the Bacterial Diversity Metadatabase

Peptococcaceae
Bacteria described in 2002